Daphne jezoensis is a shrub, of the family Thymelaeaceae.  It is native to northern Japan and parts of eastern Russia.

It has been treated as either a subspecies or a variety of Daphne kamtschatica.

Description
The shrub is summer deciduous, and grows from 0.4 to 0.6 m tall.  Its leaves are blue-green in color and its flowers are bright yellow. It is often found in deciduous forests with humus rich soil.

References

jezoensis